The Clássico da Saudade (roughly translated as The Derby of Nostalgia) is the football derby between São Paulo State clubs Sociedade Esportiva Palmeiras and Santos Futebol Clube. The derby dates from back from 1916. The match features the two most successful clubs in the history of Brazil's top division, with Palmeiras having won 11 league titles and Santos with 8. It is one of the biggest derbies in the State of São Paulo and in Brazil.

Statistics

Source: Palmeiras official records

General
337 Matches
145 Wins - Palmeiras
105 Wins - Santos
87 Draws
Palmeiras goals: 573
Santos goals: 478
Last Match: Palmeiras 1-0 Santos (2022 Campeonato Brasileiro Série A, 18 September 2022)

Source: Palmeiras official records

Campeonato Brasileiro
Including Taça Brasil and Torneio Roberto Gomes Pedrosa matches
79 Matches
25 Wins - Palmeiras
28 Wins - Santos
26 Draws
Palmeiras goals: 99
Santos goals: 105
Last Match: Palmeiras 1-0 Santos (2022 Campeonato Brasileiro Série A, 18 September 2022)

Source: Futpedia

Copa do Brasil
4 Matches
1 Win - Palmeiras
1 Win - Santos
2 Draws
Palmeiras goals: 5 (1.25 per match)
Santos goals: 5 (1.25 per match)
Last Match: Palmeiras 2–1 Santos (Copa do Brasil final - 2nd leg, 2 December 2015)

Source: Futpedia

Titles comparison

 Note: Despite some sources says that they are two distinct titles, the Intercontinental Champions' Supercup and the Supercopa Sul-Americana dos Campeões Intercontinentais, the latter was just a phase of the Intercontinental Champions' Supercup. CONMEBOL recognizes only one title, the Intercontinental Champions' Supercup.

Other

Largest victories
Palestra Italia 8–0 Santos (11 December 1932)
Santos 7–0 Palestra Italia (3 October 1915)
Palmeiras 7–1 Santos (30 April 1965)
Santos 0–6 Palmeiras (24 March 1996)
Palestra Italia 1–6 Santos (12 April 1939)
Santos 6–1 Palmeiras (23 November 1982)
Palestra Italia 6–1 Santos (20 November 1921)
Palmeiras 5–0 Santos (21 September 1997)
Palmeiras 5–0 Santos (12 December 1965)
Palestra Italia 5–0 Santos (8 July 1934)
Santos 7–3 Palmeiras (3 October 1959)
Santos 5–1 Palmeiras (3 September 2006)
Palmeiras 5–1 Santos (17 November 1979)
Palmeiras 5–1 Santos (29 November 1959)
Palmeiras 5–1 Santos (22 January 1955)
Palestra Italia 5–1 Santos (8 July 1917)
Palmeiras 4–0 Santos (18 May 2019)
Santos 0–4 Palmeiras (23 May 2004)
Santos 4–0 Palmeiras (4 June 1997)
Palmeiras 0–4 Santos (20 April 1974)
Palmeiras 0–4 Santos (10 November 1964)
Santos 4–0 Palmeiras (14 December 1952)
Palestra Italia 4–0 Santos (18 April 1937)

Highest scoring
Santos 7–6 Palmeiras (13 goals)(Torneio Rio-São Paulo, Pacaembu Stadium, 6 March 1958)

Source: Futpedia

References

External links
 Futpédia 

Brazilian football derbies
Santos FC
Sociedade Esportiva Palmeiras